is an Argentine drama film released in 1958 starring Ana Luisa Peluffo as a circus trapeze artist who brings bad luck to those who fall in love with her.

Cast
 Ana Luisa Peluffo
 Jorge Salcedo
 Fernando Soto
 
 Ramón Gay
 Margarita Corona
 Mariano Vidal Molina
 
 
 Francisco Audenino
 Andrés Lazlo
 Raúl Russo
 Strano Santos

External links
 

1958 films
1950s Spanish-language films
Argentine black-and-white films
1950s Argentine films